

68001–68100 

|-id=021
| 68021 Taiki ||  || The Japanese Taiki Town, located in the eastern part of Hokkaido, is a beautiful town blessed with clear streams and a large park filled with wild flowers on its shore. The town's Multipurpose Aerospace Park has a 1000-m airstrip where many experiments related to aerospace and large scientific balloons are undertaken. || 
|}

68101–68200 

|-id=109
| 68109 Naomipasachoff ||  || Naomi Pasachoff (born 1947), American scientific biographer and amateur astronomer who has written scientific biographies of Marie Curie, Alexander Graham Bell, Bohr, Newton, Einstein, Pauling and others. She has viewed more than 20 solar eclipses and continues to work on bringing science to the public. || 
|-id=114
| 68114 Deákferenc || 2001 AC || Ferenc Deák (1803–1876), a Hungarian statesman, Minister of Justice and honorary member of the Hungarian Academy of Sciences, whose negotiations led to the establishment of the dual monarchy of Austria-Hungary in 1867. He was known as "The Sage Of The Country". || 
|-id=144
| 68144 Mizser ||  || Attila Mizsér (born 1958) has been one of the leaders of Hungarian amateur astronomy for more than two decades. Long-time leader of the Variable Star Section of the Hungarian Astronomical Association, he has made over 52,000 visual brightness estimates of variable stars. He is also editor-in-chief of Meteor. || 
|}

68201–68300 

|-id=218
| 68218 Nealgalt ||  || Neal Galt, American amateur astronomer and newspaper columnist who has helped popularize astronomy in southeastern Arizona with his Backyard Astronomer column in the local media. || 
|}

68301–68400 

|-id=325
| 68325 Begues ||  || The Begues Observatory , in Catalan: Observatori Astronòmic de Begues, is an amateur observatory operated by Pepe Manteca, where this asteroid was discovered. From its altitude of 500 meters, the observatory offers a panoramic view of Barcelona and its suburbs some 25 kilometers away. Begues appears for the first time in history books as the place where Wifredo el Velloso defeated the Lord of Lérida, Llop Ibu Muhammed el Kari, on 11 August 897 (Src). || 
|}

68401–68500 

|-id=410
| 68410 Nichols ||  || Nichelle Nichols (1932–2022), an American author and actress, was best known for her role as Lt. Nyota Uhura in the Star Trek series. She has also been a global ambassador for NASA, a recruiter of astronauts and an inspirer of millions as an author of science fiction. She stood undaunted in her belief that humankind must seek new knowledge (Src). || 
|-id=448
| 68448 Sidneywolff ||  || Sidney C. Wolff (born 1941), American director of Kitt Peak National Observatory during 1984–1987 and the National Optical Astronomy Observatory during 1987–2001, president of the American Astronomical Society (1992–1994) and the Astronomical Society of the Pacific (1985–1986), and a founding editor of the Astronomy Education Review. || 
|}

68501–68600 

|-bgcolor=#f2f2f2
| colspan=4 align=center | 
|}

68601–68700 

|-bgcolor=#f2f2f2
| colspan=4 align=center | 
|}

68701–68800 

|-id=718
| 68718 Safi || 2002 DQ || Safi, an old Moroccan city located on the Atlantic coast. This port is well known for its sardine fisheries, phosphate industry and handmade pottery. The city is also the birthplace of Salwa Ory, wife of Swiss astronomer Michel Ory, who discovered this minor planet. || 
|-id=719
| 68719 Jangyeongsil || 2002 DW || Jang Yeongsil (1390–1450), a medieval Korean scientist. He is known for the invention of the water clock, Jagyeokru and Okru, the advancement of bronze-type printing technology and the development of astronomical instruments. The JangYeongSil Award, an annual Korean new technology product award, is also named after him. || 
|-id=730
| 68730 Straizys ||  || Vytautas Straižys (born 1936) a Lithuanian astronomer who was head of the Moletai Observatory and other astronomical institutions in Lithuania. A specialist in stellar photometry and classification, he authored the Vilnius photometric system. He founded the international journal Open Astronomy and served as president of IAU Commission 45. || 
|-id=779
| 68779 Schöninger ||  || "Schöninger", was German name used for Mount Kleť during the 17th–19th century where the discovering Kleť Observatory is located. The name means "a place with a beautiful view" in German and appears on many historical maps. In the popularized form Šenýgl, the name is still used locally. || 
|}

68801–68900 

|-id=853
| 68853 Vaimaca ||  || Vaimaca was one of the four "last charrás", native Uruguayan Indians sold by the state to a French manager to be exhibited in France in 1833. He had been an Indian chief who served as a soldier in the army of the Uruguayan national hero José Artigas. Vaimaca's mortal remains were repatriated from France to Uruguay in 2002. || 
|}

68901–69000 

|-id=947
| 68947 Brunofunk ||  || Bruno Funk (born 1930) a German amateur astronomer who founded the Messelberg Observatory in 1987 and collected all means for its realization from private and public supporters. The observatory is well known for public astronomical education. He is also the president of the amateur association Sternfreunde Donzdorf in Donzdorf (Src). || 
|-id=948
| 68948 Mikeoates ||  || Michael Oates (born 1957), a British amateur astronomer who was the most successful SOHO-comet hunter in 2003. Using his personal computer and fast Internet connections to scan through the SOHO LASCO image archive, he is credited with 138 near-sun comet discoveries (Src). || 
|}

References 

068001-069000